David Mark (born March 18, 1973) is an American journalist, author and political analyst. He is editor-in-chief of Palo Alto, California-based Politix, which is published by Topix, and a former editor at Politico. Mark has also published two books on American political campaigns and government, "Going Dirty: The Art of Negative Campaigning" (2006) and "Dog Whistles, Walk-Backs and Washington Handshakes: Decoding the Jargon Slang and Bluster of American Political Speech" (2014).

Career 

Mark earned his B.A from Brandeis University in 1995, majoring in politics, and his M.S. from the Columbia University Graduate School of Journalism, in 1997. Early in his career, Mark was a local reporter, and then worked briefly for the Associated Press. He moved to Washington, D.C., in 2000, to become a House floor/leadership reporter for Congressional Quarterly's daily publication. He then served as editor-in-chief of Campaigns & Elections magazine, which covers the business and trends of politics.

Today, Mark is editor-in-chief of the Politix website. Mark is also a frequent analyst in the media on political and current affairs topics. He often speaks to academic, business, educational and international groups, spanning the globe from Australia, Austria, Belgium, Fiji, Finland, France, Israel, Lithuania, The Netherlands, to New Zealand.

Work 

Mark's first book, Going Dirty: The Art of Negative Campaigning, was published in March 2006, with two subsequent updated editions. Going Dirty is a history of negative campaigning in American politics and an examination of how candidates and political consultants have employed this often-controversial technique. Going Dirty has gone on to be utilized by numerous college courses and news sources.

Mark's latest book is entitled Dog Whistles, Walk-Backs and Washington Handshakes: Decoding the Jargon Slang and Bluster of American Political Speech. Written with Chuck McCutcheon, co-author of the 2012 edition of the Almanac of American Politics, Dog Whistles decodes what politicians really mean when they use the "insider" political jargon that is often inaccessible to the public. Emmy Award-winning television political analyst Jeff Greenfield also wrote the foreword to the book. As Ron Fournier, national political columnist for the National Journal, reviewed, Dog Whistles is "an extraordinarily accessible and informative book that belongs on the desk of any politically-minded reader. It's my BS translator." The book was also reviewed by The Wall Street Journal book reviewer, Henry Allen. According to his review, "'Dog-whistles, Walkbacks and Washington Handshakes' will not be the last book written on political language, because political language will remain as irritating, fascinating, obfuscatory and dishonest as ever. But until the next book comes along, this one will reassure the cynics, anger the idealists, encourage a healthy skepticism and amuse those readers comfortable with the knowledge that nothing has changed and nothing will change."

Bibliography

References

External links

American male writers
1973 births
Living people